Pudsey was a local government district in the West Riding of Yorkshire from 1872 to 1974 around the town of Pudsey, covering Farsley, Calverley, Stanningley, Swinnow and Rodley.

A local board formed for the parish of Pudsey in 1872. It became an urban district in 1894 and gained the status of municipal borough in 1900.

In 1937 it absorbed Calverley Urban District (2106 acres) and Farsley Urban District (821 acres).

It was abolished in 1974 and its former area became part of the City of Leeds, a metropolitan borough of West Yorkshire.

Arms

References

History of Leeds
Municipal Borough
Municipal boroughs of England
Districts of England created by the Local Government Act 1894
Districts of England abolished by the Local Government Act 1972